Thomas Helwys (c. 1575 – c. 1616), an English minister, was one of the joint founders, with John Smyth, of the General Baptist denomination.  In the early seventeenth century, Helwys was principal formulator of demand that the church and the state be kept separate in matters of law, so that individuals might have a freedom of religious conscience. Helwys was an advocate of religious liberty at a time when to hold to such views could be dangerous. He died in prison as a consequence of the religious persecution of Protestant Dissenters under King James I.

Early life
Thomas Helwys was born in Gainsborough, from Edmund and Margaret Helwys who were descendants of an old Norman family. Edmund had sold his land in Lincolnshire and Northamptonshire and had taken a lease on Broxtowe Hall in Bilborough parish. In 1590 when his father died, Thomas Helwys assumed control of the estate, but in 1593, left the care of the estate in the hands of his father's friends and began studies in law at Gray's Inn, one of the four Inns of Court in London.  Helwys' family was on the rise in London. Geoffrey Helwys, his uncle, was a successful merchant, an alderman and the sheriff of London. His cousin, Gervase, was knighted by King James before becoming lieutenant of the Tower of London. After completing his studies at Gray's Inn in 1593, Helwys himself spent some time in the capital.

Thomas Helwys married Joan Ashmore at St, Martin's Church, Bilborough, in 1595. They had seven children over the next twelve years and lived at Broxtowe Hall. During this time, the Helwys's home became a haven for radical Puritans, Dissenters within the Church of England, and it is likely that Helwys contributed financially to their mission.

In 1606, when Archbishop Bancroft was forcing ministers to submit to the Prayer Book, Helwys took part in conference of radical puritans in Coventry discussing whether to quit the Church of England and become Brownists. The conference included John Smyth, John Robinson, Richard Bernard and Arthur Hildersham.  Helwys developed a close bond with Dissenter John Smyth and he and his wife became committed members of Smyth's Separatist or Brownist congregation in Gainsborough, Lincolnshire. The sixty or seventy Separatists in Gainsborough were allowed to meet in secret in Gainsborough Old Hall by the Hall's sympathetic owner Sir William Hickman.

Ministry

As Separatism was illegal, the Gainsborough and Scrooby Dissenters were arrested and their houses raided. Joan Helwys was imprisoned in York Castle by the Archbishop of York in the second half of 1607. Between 1607 and 1608, Helwys, Smyth, Robinson and many others from the Gainsborough and Scrooby congregations fled to the safety of Amsterdam in the more tolerant Dutch Republic.  Helwys organised the Gainsborough group's emigration - according to Robinson, ‘If any brought oars, he brought sails.’  Assuming their safety, Helwys allowed his family to remain in England. His wife was soon arrested and, after refusing to take the oath in court, she was imprisoned. It is likely that she was banished after three months in prison.

It was in the Dutch Republic that a distinctive Baptist faith first emerged amongst the English émigrés, and Helwys was one of the leaders of the foundation of the first Baptist Church in 1609. Taking the Brownist idea that church membership was only for believers to its logical conclusion, Smyth became convinced that baptism into the church should be for Christian believers only and not for infants. In January 1609, Smyth baptised himself first, then the rest of his followers starting with Helwys. The other English Separatists in Amsterdam rejected this new teaching.  Later that year, the group led by Smyth and Helwys started renting a meeting house from Dutch Mennonites, and were persuaded by them to abandon the doctrine of predestination. Some of the Baptists also accepted Mennonite christology, that Jesus did not take his flesh from Mary, but Smyth and Helwys did not, so those Baptists left the church.

In 1610, Smyth and Helwys fell out after Smyth decided he had been wrong to baptise himself and applied to join the Mennonites and be re-baptised. Helwys and about ten others split from Smyth's church. Helwys formulated the earliest Baptist confession of faith. In the next twelve months or so, Helwys wrote three more important works: an argument for Arminianism (A Short and Plain Proof, By the Word and Works of God, That God's Decree Is Not the Cause of Any Man's Sin or Condemnation: And That All Men Are Redeemed by Christ; As Also That No Infants Are Condemned), a polemic explaining his differences with the Mennonites, and, most importantly, A Short Declaration on the Mistery of Iniquity.

The Mistery of Iniquity was a critique of the failings of Catholicism, state-church Protestantism and Brownism. It was the first ever English book to defend the principle of religious liberty. For Helwys, religious liberty was a right for everyone, whether Protestants, Catholics, Jews, Muslims or atheists. The book also argued that Separatist leaders such as Smyth and Robinson had been wrong to take their churches overseas to escape persecution and that they should return to England. The historian of Separatism Stephen Tomkins described The Mistery of Iniquity as the most radical and outspoken book of the age and 'the most far-reaching declaration of universal religious freedom yet seen in English', but added: 'It is a pity that this most ground-breaking treatise of the Separatist movement should also be its most mean-spirited.'

Despite the obvious risks involved, in 1613 Helwys and twelve Baptist émigrés returned to England and founded the first Baptist congregation on English soil in Spitalfields, east London. They brought The Mistery of Iniquity with them and one copy of it was delivered to King James I, with a handwritten inscription arguing for liberty of conscience. "The King," Helwys said, "is a mortal man, and not God, therefore he hath no power over the mortal soul of his subjects to make laws and ordinances for them and to set spiritual Lords over them." Helwys and other Baptists were thrown into Newgate Prison, where they wrote a petition to the King.  Another book, Persecution for Religion Judg’d and Condemn’d, was written in Newgate in 1616, either by Helwys or his follower John Murton, and printed.  Helwys' presentation copy of A Short Declaration of the Mistery of Iniquity is still preserved in the Bodleian Library. Helwys is honoured with the Helwys Hall at Regent's Park College, Oxford. Thomas Helwys Baptist Church, in Lenton, Nottingham is named after him. Broxtowe Hall, the Helwys' family home, is now only a remnant but in nearby Bilborough Baptist Church there is a simple plaque to his memory.

Death 
Helwys died around 1616 at about the age of forty.

Notes

References

External links
Writings of Thomas Helwys
Alec Gilmore, "Thomas Helwys' plea for religious liberty in the 17th century provided a sound foundation for other kinds of freedom," The Guardian, 20 May 2006
"You Can Thank the Baptists for Freedom of Worship" by Pastor David F. Reagan
"Thomas Helwys, A Short Declaration of the Mystery of Iniquity" by Walter B. Shurden, Callaway Professor of Christianity, Executive Director, The Center for Baptist Studies, Mercer University, Macon, Georgia
"Recovering the Baptist Legacy" by Bruce Prescott
Thomas Helwys Baptist Church, Lenton, Nottingham

1570s births
LA:Thomas Heloisus
1610s deaths
People from Nottingham (district)
17th-century English Baptist ministers
English Baptist theologians
17th-century Protestant theologians
17th-century English theologians
Arminian ministers
Arminian theologians
People from Gainsborough, Lincolnshire